These villains appear in the My Little Pony series. The original show (despite people knowing it for its girly nature despite that not really being the case nor the aim of the writers) had some rather dark and menacing villains, such as Tirac, Grogar, and Lavan (and Tirac and Lavan were killed, thus making My Little Pony's first generation one of the very few TV cartoons in the 1980s to kill characters off). This stayed the same for the most part in the newer "Friendship Is Magic" canon, with villains like Nightmare Moon, Discord, Queen Chrysalis, King Sombra, Lord Tirek, and Cozy Glow.

Antagonists

My Little Pony 'n Friends

G1 My Little Pony Comics

Friendship is Magic

Equestria Girls

A New Generation

References

Sources
 

My Little Pony characters
My Little Pony: Friendship Is Magic
My Little Pony